Yustinsky District (Üstin rayon) is an administrative and municipal district (raion), one of the thirteen in the Republic of Kalmykia, Russia. It is located in the northeast and east of the republic. Its administrative center is the rural locality (a settlement) of Tsagan Aman. As of the 2010 Census, the total population of the district was 10,585, with the population of Tsagan Aman accounting for 56.9% of that number.

History
The district was established in 1938.

Administrative and municipal status
Within the framework of administrative divisions, Yustinsky District is one of the thirteen in the Republic of Kalmykia. The district is divided into seven rural administrations which comprise fourteen rural localities. As a municipal division, the district is incorporated as Yustinsky Municipal District. Its seven rural administrations are incorporated as seven rural settlements within the municipal district. The settlement of Tsagan Aman serves as the administrative center of both the administrative and municipal district.

References

Notes

Sources

Districts of Kalmykia
 
States and territories established in 1938